Ferhat Görgülü (born 28 October 1991) is a Dutch professional footballer of Turkish descent who plays as a defender for Arnavutköy Belediyespor in the Turkish TFF Second League.

Career
Görgülü was born in Veendam, Groningen, Netherlands to parents of Turkish origin. There, he began playing football in the youth department of Veendam in 1894 and then progressed through the academies of SC Heerenveen and BV Veendam. In the summer of 2010, he was promoted to the first team of Veendam competing in the second-tier Eerste Divisie. In his first season, Görgülü made three league appearances. He spent the first half of the 2011–12 season at Veendam, while he played the second half at FC Groningen. In the summer of 2012, he moved to FC Oss within the league. There, he quickly became a starter and made 28 league appearances in which he scored two goals by the end of the season.

After strong performances at Oss, Turkish Süper Lig club Gençlerbirliği signed Görgülü in the summer of 2013. After four years at the club, he moved to Kardemir Karabükspor in the summer of 2017 where he signed a two-year contract. A year later he went to play for Giresunspor. The following season he returned to the Netherlands, where he signed with Emmen in the Eredivisie. In September 2021, Görgülü moved to Kırklarelispor in the Turkish TFF Second League.

References

External links
Voetbal International 
 

1991 births
People from Veendam
Footballers from Groningen (province)
Living people
Dutch footballers
Dutch people of Turkish descent
Gençlerbirliği S.K. footballers
Eredivisie players
Eerste Divisie players
SC Veendam players
TOP Oss players
Kardemir Karabükspor footballers
Giresunspor footballers
FC Emmen players
Kırklarelispor footballers
Süper Lig players
TFF First League players
TFF Second League players
Association football defenders
Dutch expatriate footballers
Expatriate footballers in Turkey
Dutch expatriate sportspeople in Turkey